Defence Intelligence (DI) is an organisation within the United Kingdom intelligence community which focuses on gathering and analysing military intelligence. It differs from the UK's intelligence agencies (MI6, GCHQ and MI5) in that it is an integral part of a government department – the Ministry of Defence (MoD) – rather than a stand-alone organisation. The organisation employs a mixture of civilian and military staff and is funded within the UK's defence budget. The organisation was formerly known as the Defence Intelligence Staff (DIS), but changed its name in 2009.

The primary role of Defence Intelligence is that of 'all-source' intelligence analysis. This discipline draws information from a variety of overt and covert sources to provide the intelligence needed to support military operations, contingency planning, and to inform defence policy and procurement decisions. The maintenance of the ability to give timely strategic warning of politico-military and scientific and technical developments with the potential to affect UK interests is a vital part of the process. DI's assessments are used outside the MoD to support the work of the Joint Intelligence Committee (JIC) and to assist the work of other Government departments (OGDs) and international partners (such as NATO and the European Union). It is this 'all-source' function which distinguishes Defence Intelligence from other organisations such as SIS and GCHQ which focus on the collection of 'single-source' Human Intelligence (HUMINT) and Signals Intelligence (SIGINT) respectively. As such Defence Intelligence occupies a unique position within the UK intelligence community.

The organisation is headed by the Chief of Defence Intelligence, currently Adrian Bird who replaced General James Hockenhull after his appointment as Commander, Strategic Command

History

Origins 
Defence Intelligence can trace its history back to 1873 with the formation of the Intelligence Branch of the British War Office, which, in 1888, became the Directorate of Military Intelligence. The Committee of Imperial Defence, established in 1902, had the task of co-ordinating the different armed services on issues of military strategy intelligence assessments and estimates.

Military Intelligence 
During World War I (1914–1918), Military Intelligence (MI) departments, such as MI1 for the secretariat of the Director of Military Intelligence (now GCHQ), were responsible for various intelligence gathering functions. Many of the original MI departments, such as MI4 (Aerial Photography) were renamed or eventually subsumed into Defence Intelligence.

Joint Intelligence Bureau 
Shortly after the 1945 end of the Second World War, the topographical department of the War Office was transformed into the Joint Intelligence Bureau (JIB), and its director, Sir Kenneth Strong, became a full member of the Joint Intelligence Committee (JIC) in January 1947. The JIB was structured into a series of divisions: procurement (JIB 1), geographic (JIB 2 and JIB 3), defences, ports and beaches (JIB 4), airfields (JIB 5), key points (JIB 6), oil (JIB 7) and telecommunications (JIB 8).

Defence Intelligence Staff 
When the Ministry of Defence (MOD) formed in 1964, Naval Intelligence, Military Intelligence and Air Intelligence combined to form the Defence Intelligence Staff (DIS). Although the DIS focussed initially on Cold-War issues, more recently its attention has moved to support for overseas operations, to weapons of mass destruction and to international counter-terrorism activities.

Since the beginning of the Russian invasion of Ukraine, the Defence Intelligence has regularly released intelligence information, including information on the course of the war. The Russian government accuses the UK Government of a targeted disinformation campaign. Intelligence information released has included details of anticipated Russian troop movements.

Organisation
Defence Intelligence is headed by the Chief of Defence Intelligence (CDI) who is either a serving three-star military officer or a Senior Civil Servant and who, as the MOD's 'intelligence process owner', is also responsible for the overall co-ordination of intelligence activities throughout the Armed Forces and single Service Commands. He is supported by two deputies—one civilian and one military. The civilian Deputy Chief of Defence Intelligence (DCDI) is responsible for Defence Intelligence analysis and production and the military Director of Cyber Intelligence and Information Integration (DCI3) is responsible for intelligence collection and capability.

Deputy Chief of Defence Intelligence (DCDI)
DCDI manages the intelligence analysis and production directorates of Defence Intelligence. These include directorates for:
 Strategic Assessments (regional and thematic)
 Capability Assessments (weapons systems and platforms)
 Counter Proliferation
 Counter Intelligence

DCDI is responsible for intelligence analysis and production, providing global defence intelligence assessments and strategic warning on a wide range of issues including, intelligence support for operations; proliferation and arms control; conventional military capabilities; strategic warning and technical evaluations of weapons systems. These intelligence assessments draw upon classified information provided by GCHQ, SIS, the Security Service, Allied intelligence services and military collection assets, in addition to diplomatic reporting and a wide range of publicly available or ‘open source’ information such as media reporting and the internet.

Director of Cyber Intelligence and Information Integration (DCI3)
DCI3 is responsible for the provision of specialised intelligence, imagery and geographic support services, and for the intelligence and security training of the Armed Forces. In addition to a Head Office policy staff he is responsible for two major groupings within Defence Intelligence:

Joint Forces Intelligence Group (JFIG)
The JFIG was established in 2012 under the new Joint Forces Command and superseded the Intelligence Collection Group (ICG). Making up the largest sub-element of Defence Intelligence, JFIG is responsible for the collection of signals, geospatial, imagery and measurement and signature intelligence and comprises:
 The National Centre for Geospatial Intelligence (NCGI) formerly known as the Defence Geospatial Intelligence Fusion Centre (DGIFC) and prior to that JARIC (Joint Air Reconnaissance Intelligence Centre)
The Defence Geographic Centre (DGC)
 Joint Services Signals Organisation (JSSO)
 Defence HUMINT Unit (DHU)

The National Centre for Geospatial Intelligence (NCGI) is based at RAF Wyton in Cambridgeshire (since moving from RAF Brampton in 2013) and provides specialist imagery intelligence to the armed forces and other UK government customers. They deliver this through the exploitation of satellite imaging systems, as well as airborne and ground-based collection systems. NCGI uses these sources, together with advanced technologies, to provide regional intelligence assessments and support to strategic intelligence projections.

The Defence HUMINT Organisation (DHO) is a Tri-Service organisation that provides specialist support to military operations. The DHO manages strategic aspects of defence human intelligence and is under the command of a Colonel. It draws staff from across the three services.

The Joint Services Signals Organisation (JSSO) conducts research into new communications systems and techniques in order to provide operational support to static and deployed units. The JSSO is based at RAF Digby in Lincolnshire under the command of a Group Captain with some 1,600 staff drawn from all three services.

In 2013, JFIG HQ moved from Feltham in Middlesex to RAF Wyton.

Joint Intelligence Training Group (JITG)
The Joint Intelligence Training Group (JITG), at Chicksands, Bedfordshire, provides a single defence focal point for intelligence, security, languages and photography training in the UK, though photography training is carried out at the Defence School of Photography (DSoP) at RAF Cosford. The organisation consists of a headquarters, the Defence College of Intelligence and a specialist operational intelligence capability. JITG is co-located with the headquarters of the British Army's Intelligence Corps.

Defence intelligence roles
To support its mission, Defence Intelligence has four essential roles:

Support to operations: DI plays an integral part in the planning process throughout all stages of military operations, by providing intelligence collection and analysis at the tactical, operational and strategic levels. Examples of the support DI has provided to operations are:
 Coalition action in Iraq
 NATO led forces in Afghanistan and Bosnia
 UN humanitarian and peace-support operations in Sierra Leone, Liberia, Cyprus, Eritrea and the Democratic Republic of Congo
DI has deployed intelligence analysts, linguists and reservists overseas, and provide geographic support by supplying both standard and specialised mapping to overseas theatres.

Support to contingency planning for operations: DI provides intelligence data and all source assessments that assist in preparations for future situations with the potential to require the commitment of UK Armed Forces. These products, which cover political and military developments, country and cultural information, critical infrastructure and internal security, all aid contingency planning.

Provision of early warning: A fundamental responsibility of Defence Intelligence is to alert ministers, chiefs of staff, senior officials and defence planners to impending crises around the world. Such warning is vital for short and medium term planning. DI meets this responsibility by focusing on current areas and topics of concern, highlighting the effects of changing circumstances, predicting security and stability trends, and assessing how these trends may develop. The assessments are distributed to decision-makers throughout the MOD, the Armed Forces, other government departments, allies, and UK Embassies and High Commissions.

Provision of longer-term analysis of emerging threats: Defence Intelligence provides longer-term assessments of likely scenarios around the world where UK Armed Forces might need to operate and of the equipment that they might face. It also provides technical support to the development of future military equipment and to the development of countermeasures against potentially hostile systems.

How Defence Intelligence carries out its work
Direction: The Chief of Defence Intelligence (CDI) receives direction from the Chief of Defence Staff (CDS) and Permanent Under Secretary (PUS) on MOD's Intelligence needs and draws national guidance from the Cabinet Office Joint Intelligence Committee (JIC).

Analysis and production: Intelligence assessments are written to meet the needs of customers and must be timely and relevant. The assessment process involves judging the authenticity and reliability of new information and its relevance to existing intelligence. Assessments focus on probable and possible outcomes, to provide the best available advice for developing a response or resolution. They are continually adjusted in light of new intelligence or events.

Chiefs of Defence Intelligence
The Chiefs have been as follows:
Director-General Intelligence
 Major-General Sir Kenneth Strong, 1964–1966
 Air Chief Marshal Sir Alfred Earle, rtd 1966–1968
 Air Marshal Sir Harold Maguire, rtd 1968–1972
 Vice-Admiral Sir Louis Le Bailly rtd 1972–1975
 Lieutenant-General Sir David Willison, rtd 1975–1978
 Air Chief Marshal Sir John Aiken, rtd 1978–1981
 Vice-Admiral Sir Roy Halliday, rtd 1981–1984

Chiefs of Defence Intelligence
 Air Marshal Sir Michael Armitage 1984–1986
 Lieutenant-General Sir Derek Boorman 1986–1988
 Vice-Admiral Sir John Kerr 1988–1991
 Air Marshal Sir John Walker, 1991–1994
 Lieutenant-General Sir John Foley, 1994–1997
 Vice-Admiral Sir Alan West, 1997–2000
 Air Marshal Sir Joe French, 2000–2003
 Lieutenant-General Sir Andrew Ridgway, 2003–2006
 Air Marshal Sir Stuart Peach 2006–2009
 Air Marshal Christopher Nickols 2009–2012
 Vice-Admiral Alan Richards 2012–2015
 Air Marshal Philip Osborn 2015–2018
 General James Hockenhull 2018–2022
 Adrian Bird 2022–Present

See also
 British intelligence agencies
 Defense Intelligence Agency (DIA) – United States counterpart
 National Geospatial Intelligence Agency (NGA) – United States counterpart
 Canadian Forces Intelligence Command (CFINTCOM) – Canadian counterpart
 Defence Intelligence Organisation (DIO) – Australian counterpart
 Australian Geospatial Organisation (AGO) – Australian counterpart
 Directorate of Defence Intelligence and Security (DDIS) – New Zealand counterpart
 Defence Intelligence Fusion Centre
 List of intelligence agencies
 Ministry of Defence
 Operation Rockingham
 RAF Intelligence

References

Sources

External links
 Defence Intelligence
 Defence Intelligence Staff (last updated 2012)
 National Intelligence Machinery
 Defence Intelligence (last updated 2012; withdrawn 2014)

 

British intelligence agencies
Huntingdonshire
Military communications of the United Kingdom
Military intelligence agencies
Military units and formations established in 1964
Ministry of Defence (United Kingdom)
Organisations based in Cambridgeshire
Science and technology in Cambridgeshire